Thomas Williams (born 2 February 1846, date of death unknown) was an ironfounder, businessman and Christchurch City & Gore Borough Councillor in the South Island of New Zealand.

Williams established his engineering business in Christchurch New Zealand in 1864, aged only 18. He made New Zealand flax machinery and kitchen ranges of which he sold 150 in 2 years. His foundry could turn out castings up to 16cwt. Williams was contracted by New Zealand Railways to supply a steam crane for 600 pounds-the first of its kind to be made in New Zealand in August 1872.

Thomas Williams was elected to the Christchurch City Council in 1872 and the Gore Borough Council in 1887.

See also
Mel Courtney – great-grandson of Thomas Williams

References

"The Cyclopedia of New Zealand" (1903, The Cyclopedia Company Limited, Christchurch)
"GR MacDonald Dictionary of Biography" (Undated, GR MacDonald, Christchurch)

1846 births
Year of death unknown
New Zealand businesspeople
Christchurch City Councillors
People from Gore, New Zealand
19th-century New Zealand engineers